Alistair or Alastair Campbell may refer to:

 Alastair Campbell (athlete) (1890–1943), English cricketer and footballer
 Alistair Campbell (academic) (1907–1974), Rawlinson and Bosworth Professor of Anglo-Saxon at the University of Oxford
 Alistair Te Ariki Campbell (1925–2009), New Zealander
 Alastair Campbell (bioethicist) (born 1938), British bioethicist
 Alastair Campbell, Lord Bracadale (born 1949), Scottish jurist
 Alastair Campbell, 4th Baron Colgrain (born 1951), British hereditary peer
 Alastair Campbell (born 1957), British political aide and Labour Party strategist associated with Tony Blair
 Ali Campbell (Alistair Ian Campbell, born 1959), British singer formerly with UB40
 Alistair Campbell (cricketer) (born 1972), Zimbabwean test cricketer

See also
Alister Campbell (disambiguation)